The United States Senate election of 1942 in New Jersey was held on November 3, 1942. Incumbent Democratic Senator William Smathers ran for re-election to a second term, but was defeated by Republican businessman Albert Hawkes. 

Democratic primary

Candidates
William Smathers, incumbent Senator

Results
Senator Smathers was unopposed for re-nomination.

Republican primary

Candidates

Declared
George Biehl
Joseph A. Bower
Albert Hawkes, director of the United States Chamber of Commerce
Franklin W. Kielb, attorney from North Plainfield
George O. Pullen, candidate for Senate in 1938 and 1940
Gill Robb Wilson, Presbyterian minister and founder of the Civil Air Patrol

Results

General election

Candidates
Elmo L. Bateman (Prohibition)
William L. Becker (Socialist)
George Breitman (Socialist Workers), activist and editor of The Militant
John C. Butterworth (Socialist Labor)
Lorenzo Harris (Progressive Independent)
Albert W. Hawkes (Republican), director of the United States Chamber of Commerce
William H. Smathers (Democrat), incumbent Senator since 1937

Results

See also 
1942 United States Senate elections

References

New Jersey
1942
1942 New Jersey elections